Social Life is the second studio album by the American indie rock band Koufax. The song "Bright Side" was featured in an episode of the adult animated sitcom Clone High.

Background 
Unlike the previous album “Social Life”was recorded as a quartet. Instead of recording with two keyboard players, this time they decided to record additional guitar parts.

After the last record two members left the band. Ben Force was included as a new band member, replacing not only the bass player. Since he also played guitar, he was able to complement the keyboard player as well. Accordingly, the new album was heavier on the guitars.

The credits are indicated as follows in the blurb: “Suchan writes the Lion's share of the Koufax cuts, although not strictly in that order.“

Track listing

Reception 
The album received mainly positive reviews:

"It's funny how much difference a little piano can make on a rock record […] But with the piano, Koufax are iconoclasts, recalling some of the least hipster-friendly music of the last 25 years while still managing to sound contemporary…" - Popmatters

"Koufax seem to have all the right ingredients in place: crisp songwriting, charismatic swagger vocals, punchy rhythm, horn-embellished riffs. […] The quartet is confident enough to list their most obvious heroes right on the cover– I’d already called Joe Jackson and Elvis Costello before squinting through the fine print." - Pitchfork

"The overall effect is like a less-histrionic XTC emerging from a garage with an upbeat Ben Folds Five.Social Life is a distinguished piece of rock archeology with enough passion to suggest that Koufax may have a part to play in the unfolding tapestry of distinctive voices in the rock world." - Allmusic

Personnel

The Band 

 Robert Suchan – vocals, guitar
 Jared Rosenberg – piano, synthesizer
 Ben Force  – bass, guitars, background vocals
 Dave Shettler – drums, percussion, synthesizer, bass [piano], background vocals

Additional musicians 

 Dan Clucas - trumpet, flugelhorn
 Vince Meghromi - saxophone [tenor], flute

Technical 

 Dave Trumfio, Michael Krassner – production, recording
 Don C. Tyler – mastering

External links 

 Social Life at Waxing Nostalgic

References

2002 albums
Koufax (band) albums